Voskresenovka is a rural locality (a selo) and the administrative center of Voskresenovsky Selsoviet of Mikhaylovsky District, Amur Oblast, Russia. The population was 230 as of 2018. There are 4 streets.

Geography 
Voskresenovka is located 43 km northeast of Poyarkovo (the district's administrative centre) by road. Bezozyornoye is the nearest rural locality.

References 

Rural localities in Mikhaylovsky District, Amur Oblast